Bakul was a Bengali drama film directed by Bholanath Mitra. This movie was released in 1954 under the banner of New Theatres. The music direction was done by Pranab Dey. This movie stars Uttam Kumar, Arundhati Devi, Rajlakshmi Devi, Tulsi Chakraborty and Sobha Sen in the lead roles.

Cast
 Arundhati Devi 
 Uttam Kumar 
 Rajlakshmi Devi
 Tulsi Chakraborty 
 Sobha Sen
 Bibhu 
 Rekha Chattopadhyay 
 Asalata Devi
 Hari Basu 
 Sudipta Ray 
 Chabi Ghosal

References

External links
 

1954 films
Bengali-language Indian films
1954 drama films
1950s Bengali-language films
Indian drama films
Indian black-and-white films